Ashleigh Barty and Demi Schuurs were the defending champions, but chose not to participate together. Barty played alongside Victoria Azarenka and successfully defended the title, defeating Schuurs and Anna-Lena Grönefeld in the final, 4–6, 6–0, [10–3].

Seeds
The top four seeds received a bye into the second round.

Draw

Finals

Top half

Bottom half

References

External Links
 Main Draw

Women's Doubles
Italian Open - Women's Doubles